The 1978 Belmont Stakes was the 110th running of the Belmont Stakes.  It occurred on June 10, 1978, and was televised on CBS. Affirmed completed the 11th Triple Crown after his victories in the 1978 Kentucky Derby and the 1978 Preakness Stakes.  As in the prior two legs of the Triple Crown, he narrowly defeated Alydar.

Affirmed and Alydar ran head to head for the last half mile of the mile and a half race, with Affirmed ultimately winning by a head.  Affirmed's winning time of 2:26 4/5 was the 3rd best in history at the time, behind only Secretariat's all-time record of 2:24 in 1973 and Gallant Man's time of 2:26 3/5 in 1957.  This was despite a slow early pace.

Payout 
The 110th Belmont Payout Schedule

* – No show wagering.

Full chart

Race Information:
 Winning Breeder: Harbor View Farm
 Final Time: 2:26.80
 Attendance:

References

Belmont Stakes races
Belmont Stakes
Belmont Stakes
Belmont Stakes
Belmont Stakes